Carolina Montserrat Tohá Morales (born 12 May 1965) is a Chilean political scientist and politician from the Party for Democracy (Partido por la Democracia, PPD), currently serving as Minister of the Interior and Public Security. She was previously mayor of Santiago from 2012 to 2016.

Biography
Carolina Tohá is the daughter of the socialist politician José Tohá, who served as Minister of the Interior and Minister of Defence in the government of Salvador Allende, and was tortured and killed by the country's military dictatorship in 1974. Tohá studied law at the University of Chile between 1980 and 1983, and entered politics in 1984, when she participated in the refounding of the University of Chile Student Federation (FECh). She was one of the founders of the PPD in 1987. From 1990, Tohá studied political science at the University of Milan, where she obtained a Ph.D. in 1994.

In 2000–2001, during the presidency of Ricardo Lagos, Tohá served as Undersecretary General of Government. She was elected to the Chamber of Deputies for Santiago in 2001, and was re-elected in 2005. On 12 March 2009, Tohá replaced Francisco Vidal in the Ministry General Secretariat of Government, becoming the first woman to hold that post in the country's history. Her congress seat became vacant and was later taken by Felipe Harboe, as both positions are incompatible with each other in times of peace. On 14 December 2009, she left her government post to lead Eduardo Frei Ruiz-Tagle's presidential run-off campaign. In 2010, Tohá was elected president of the PPD. On 28 October 2012, she was elected mayor of Santiago by an absolute majority, ending the right's 12-year rule over the municipality. In 2016, she lost the election to Felipe Alessandri. After her term as mayor ended, she taught urban planning at the University of Chile.

On 6 September 2022, Tohá replaced Izkia Siches as Minister of the Interior and Public Security in the cabinet of Gabriel Boric, after a cabinet reshuffle following the rejection of the proposed new constitution in the 2022 Chilean national plebiscite.

Personal life

Tohá married Socialist Party politician Fulvio Rossi in 2005 and separated from him in 2011. She has one son and one daughter.

Controversies

Irregular financing from SQM

In May 2016, the Chilean Prosecutor's Office began to investigate irregular financing from Sociedad Química y Minera (SQM) – a chemical company whose largest shareholder is Julio Ponce Lerou - to the PPD through false vouchers issued by the foundation Chile Ambiente, which was controlled by the PPD member Patricio Rodrigo. The funding occurred between 2011 and 2012, when Tohá was president of the PPD, and made possible the transfer of 57 million Chilean pesos to the party.

She was questioned because it was reported that in 2011 she had signed a certificate to the Electoral Service to register Chile Ambiente as a party's political formation institute, enabling the body to receive donations to the PPD.

References

1965 births
Living people
Chilean people of Spanish descent
Chilean Ministers of the Interior
Members of the Chamber of Deputies of Chile
Mayors of Santiago
Chilean Ministers Secretary General of Government
Party for Democracy (Chile) politicians
Academic staff of the University of Chile
University of Chile alumni
University of Milan alumni
Chilean political scientists
Women mayors of places in Chile
Women government ministers of Chile
Women members of the Chamber of Deputies of Chile
Women political scientists